Perimeter College at Georgia State University  is a college of Georgia State University in Atlanta, Georgia.  Georgia Perimeter College was originally a public community college founded by an Atlanta area county board of education before merging with Georgia State University in 2016 to create one of the largest universities in the United States with over 50,000 students. The Perimeter College (PC) campuses became components of Georgia State University, still maintaining their own mission, degrees, and admittance requirements, separate from those of the main campus. Before merging with GSU, PC served metro Atlanta with five campus locations and offered more than 40 programs of study, including Arts, Music, Theatre, Nursing, Business Administration, Education, Dental Hygiene, Criminal Justice, and Sign Language Interpreting.

History 
Perimeter College was founded by the DeKalb County Board of Education as DeKalb College in 1958 and offered its first classes in Clarkston, Georgia, in 1964.  Its service area grew as new campuses opened and students came to the college from throughout the metro area. In 1997, DeKalb College was renamed Georgia Perimeter College. It was called Georgia Perimeter College, as a two-year associate degree-granting unit of the University System of Georgia until January 6, 2016.

Campuses 

 Three in DeKalb County:
 Clarkston Campus (formerly known as "Central Campus"), in an unincorporated area south of Clarkston, is the original campus.
 Decatur Campus (formerly known as "South Campus"), in an unincorporated area south of Decatur.
 Dunwoody Campus (formerly known as "North Campus"), in Dunwoody Home to an observatory that is available for public use.
 Newton County: Newton Campus, in an unincorporated area, south of I-20 and east of Covington.
 Fulton County: Alpharetta Center, in Alpharetta in north Fulton County.
The Perimeter College Botanical Gardens include a Native Plant Garden and the Ferns of the World Garden, which contains more species of ferns than any other garden in the United States. Discussions about plants, garden walks and special sales are open to the public.

Academic profile 
Perimeter College was the largest two-year college and the fourth-largest institution in the University System of Georgia, with about 21,371 students enrolled. PC's online program was the largest in the state university system, serving over 9,000 students. Perimeter College transferred almost 3,000 students annually to bachelor's degree programs within the University System of Georgia, accounting for one-fifth of transfers within the system. To allow students to transfer to four-year institutions of their choice, Perimeter pioneered a Transfer Admission Guarantee (TAG) program, signing more than 40 TAG agreements with in-state, out-of-state, public and private four-year colleges and universities.

More than one-third of Perimeter College's faculty members earned their doctorate; this statistic did not include numerous part-time instructors. PC had more Governor's Teaching Fellows than any other institution in Georgia: 40 since 1996. More than 46 PC faculty members received National Institute for Staff and Organizational Development Teaching Excellence Awards since 2003.

The 3-year graduation rate was 7% before amalgamation with Georgia State University.

Military outreach 
Perimeter College's Military Outreach program served one of the largest military and veteran populations in the State, with over 1,100 military-affiliated students attending PC each semester. Designated year after year as a Military Friendly and Best-For-Vets institution, PC's Military Outreach program had been recognized as a model in the State and across the Nation. The Military Outreach Center provided all the services, support and assistance student veterans need to reach their academic goals. PC had Military Outreach Centers located on all five campuses and provide personalized assistance to its many Online student veterans, offering everything from academic and financial aid counseling, to scholarships and emergency grants for military/veteran students and their families. PC honored its student veterans by Serving Those Who Have Served.

Student life 
Perimeter College's Fine Arts program presented plays, art exhibits and musical performances that were open to the public. The 2009–2010 season included more than 100 events. The college was also home to the DeKalb Symphony Orchestra and the Southern Academy for Literary Arts & Scholarly Research, which celebrated literature and scholarship and hosts an assortment of visiting writers who engage students, faculty, and staff. The Chattahoochee Review was the nationally recognized literary magazine published by the college. Teresa Weaver of Atlanta Magazine described it as a "fine literary journal". It received attention as a journal of Southern literature, featuring such writers as James Dickey, but expanded its scope to include international works.

In early 2010, Perimeter College opened the Atlanta Center for Civic Engagement & Service Learning on its Clarkston Campus. The center worked to enhance student learning by providing opportunities for students to apply what they learn into the classroom to real-life situations. Through such activities, they worked to enhance the economic, social and cultural vitality of PC's communities, while offering students, faculty, educators and community members the training, tools and support they needed to get engaged and make a difference.

Media 
The Collegian was the student newspaper of Perimeter College. The paper was published to over 11,000 people all over the metro Atlanta area. The Collegian covered all five campuses in the areas of Campus News, Campus Life, Academics, Administration, Features and Opinions.

Sport 
The college athletics teams were nicknamed the Jaguars.

Notable people 

Ron Blomberg (born 1948), Major League Baseball player
Marlon Byrd, Major League Baseball player
Shad Gaspard, professional wrestler and actor
Nick Green, Major League Baseball player
Eban Hyams (born 1981), Indian-born Australian professional basketball player
Gucci Mane, rapper, attended on a HOPE scholarship from 2000 to 2001.
 Janelle Monáe, vocalist, performer 
Howard Mosby, Member of the Georgia House of Representatives

References

External links
Official website

 
Buildings and structures in Fulton County, Georgia
Buildings and structures in Newton County, Georgia
Education in Fulton County, Georgia
Education in Newton County, Georgia
Educational institutions established in 1958
Universities and colleges accredited by the Southern Association of Colleges and Schools
Universities and colleges in DeKalb County, Georgia
Public universities and colleges in Georgia (U.S. state)
NJCAA athletics
1958 establishments in Georgia (U.S. state)